In geometry, the two ears theorem states that every simple polygon with more than three vertices has at least two ears, vertices that can be removed from the polygon without introducing any crossings. The two ears theorem is equivalent to the existence of polygon triangulations. It is frequently attributed to Gary H. Meisters, but was proved earlier by Max Dehn.

Statement of the theorem
An ear of a polygon is defined as a vertex  such that the line segment between the two neighbors of  lies entirely in the interior of the polygon. The two ears theorem states that every simple polygon has at least two ears.

Ears from triangulations
An ear and its two neighbors form a triangle within the polygon that is not crossed by any other part of the polygon. Removing a triangle of this type produces a polygon with fewer sides, and repeatedly removing ears allows any simple polygon to be triangulated.

Conversely, if a polygon is triangulated, the weak dual of the triangulation (a graph with one vertex per triangle and one edge per pair of adjacent triangles) will be a tree and each leaf of the tree will form an ear. Since every tree with more than one vertex has at least two leaves, every triangulated polygon with more than one triangle has at least two ears. Thus, the two ears theorem is equivalent to the fact that every simple polygon has a triangulation.

Related types of vertex
An ear is called exposed when it forms a vertex of the convex hull of the polygon. However, it is possible for a polygon to have no exposed ears.

Ears are a special case of a principal vertex, a vertex such that the line segment connecting the vertex's neighbors does not cross the polygon or touch any other vertex of it. A principal vertex for which this line segment lies outside the polygon is called a mouth. Analogously to the two ears theorem, every non-convex simple polygon has at least one mouth. Polygons with the minimum  number of principal vertices of both types, two ears and a mouth, are called anthropomorphic polygons.

History and proof
The two ears theorem is often attributed to a 1975 paper by Gary H. Meisters, from which the "ear" terminology originated. However, the theorem was proved earlier by Max Dehn (circa 1899) as part of a proof of the Jordan curve theorem. To prove the theorem, Dehn observes that every polygon has at least three convex vertices. This diagonal decomposes the polygon into two smaller polygons, and repeated decomposition by ears and diagonals eventually produces a triangulation of the whole polygon, from which an ear can be found as a leaf of the dual tree.

References

External links
Meisters' Two Ears Theorem, Cut-the-Knot
The Two-Ears Theorem, Godfried Toussaint

Theorems about polygons